The White River is a small river in the southern San Joaquin Valley of the U.S. state of California. It flows west, receiving several seasonal tributaries including Arrastre Creek, Coarse Gold Creek and Coho Creek, passing the small settlement of White River. As it nears the border of Tulare County and Kern County its surface flow disappears. The dry riverbed continues northwest into the agricultural San Joaquin Valley and is diverted into canals for flood control and irrigation purposes.

References

ACME Mapper

Rivers of Kern County, California
Rivers of Tulare County, California
Rivers of Southern California
Rivers of Northern California